PROV may stand for:

 Public Record Office Victoria
 W3C's PROV family of data provenance specifications